Route 365 is a  long east–west secondary highway in the northeast portion of New Brunswick, Canada.

The route's eastern terminus is in the community of Saint-Isidore. The road starts off traveling south to the community of Tilley Road.  Here the road takes a 90 degree turn east to the community of Gauvreau.  The road then follows the Tracadie River, crossing the river twice before entering the community of Little Tracadie.  The road crosses Route 11 before ending in the town of Tracadie-Sheila.

Intersecting routes
Route 11

See also

References

365
365